Wetmore v. Tennessee Copper Company, 218 U.S. 369 (1910), was a United States Supreme Court case involving jurisdiction over a suit involving a wealthy landowner from Rhode Island, U.S. Senator George P. Wetmore, suing a New Jersey Corporation for emitting toxic fumes onto land he owned in Tennessee. The Court followed its precedent in Ladew v. Tennessee Copper Company, in asserting that jurisdiction was improper because neither party was a citizen in the jurisdiction of the Circuit court, but jurisdiction was proper over the foreign British corporation that was joined to the suit.

References

External links
 

United States Supreme Court cases
United States Supreme Court cases of the White Court
United States environmental case law
United States federal jurisdiction case law
1910 in United States case law
Copper mining in the United States
Copper Basin (Tennessee)